Aske Bang (born April 1, 1988) is a Danish actor and director. Best known for his work on Silent Nights as director, which earned him critical appraisal and recognition including Academy Award for Best Live Action Short Film at the 89th Academy Awards in 2017.

Filmography
 2017: 3 Things (post-production)  
 2013: Retrograde (Short) (completed)  
 2016: In the Blood  
 2016: Silent Nights  (Short)  
 2015: The Stranger (Short)  
 2015: Anton90 (TV Series)  
 2015: Tomgang (TV Series)  
 2015: Midtimellem  
 2014: Pussy (Short)  
 2014: Familien Jul  
 2013: Antboy  
 2012: Talenttyven
 2011: Alla Salute! (TV Series) (5 episodes)  
 2011: Ladyboy 
 2011: Borgen (TV Series)  
 2011: Intet kan røre mig (Short)  
 2011: Those Who Kill (TV Series)  
 2011: Alla Salute! (TV Series)  
 2010: To All My Friends (Short)  
 2009-2010: Park Road (TV Series)  
 2008: Little Soldier  
 2008: The Matjulskis (Short)  
 2008: Album (TV Series)

Awards
 Nominated: Academy Award for Best Live Action Short Film - Silent Nights

References

External links
 

Danish directors
Danish producers
1988 births
Living people